Hualālai (pronounced  in Hawaiian) is an active volcano on the island of Hawaii in the Hawaiian Islands. It is the westernmost, third-youngest and the third-most active of the five volcanoes that form the island of Hawaii, following Kīlauea and the much larger Mauna Loa. Hualālai is estimated to have risen above sea level about 300,000 years ago. Despite maintaining a very low level of activity since its last eruption in 1801, and being unusually inactive for the last 2,000 years, Hualālai is still considered active, and is expected to erupt again some time within the next century. The relative unpreparedness of the residents in the area caused by the lull in activity would worsen the consequences of such an event.

The area near the volcano has been inhabited for centuries by Hawaiian natives, dating back to before recorded history. The coast west of Hualālai in particular had several royal complexes. The volcano is also important ecologically, is home to many rare species and several nature reserves near the summit, and is a popular hiking attraction. Today the coast near Hualālai is dotted by vacation resorts, some built on historic flows, and a National Historical Park.

Geology

Structural features 

It is the westernmost of the five major volcanoes which form the island of Hawaii. Being in the post-shield stage of development, Hualālai is overall much rougher in shape and structure than the more youthful Mauna Loa and Kīlauea. There are over 100 cinder and spatter cones arranged along these rift zones. In comparison with the other volcanoes of the island of Hawaii, it is the third-tallest, third-youngest, third-most active, and second-smallest, making up just 7% of the island.

The cone is constructed of trachyte, a type of volcanic lava that is not found on other volcanoes on the island of Hawaii. Trachyte flows move more slowly than the typically "runny" Hawaiian lavas, a characteristic caused by its high (over 62%) silica composition (typical basalt is only 50% silica). Geologists hypothesize that Puu Waawaa originally formed during a pumice eruption a little over 100,000 years ago, and has continued to build itself since then, with at least three distinct trachyte flows recognized. The eruptions, although partially covered by flows from Hualālai and Mauna Loa, have built a distinctive structure known as the Puu Anahulu ridge.

The westward-facing flank of Hualālai forms a large underwater slump known as the North Kona slump. This area was explored more closely in a 2001 joint Japan-United States project to explore the volcano's flanks, utilizing the remotely operated vehicle ROV Kaikō.

Hualālai is a known source for xenoliths, rock from the Earth's mantle that have been brought up in lava flows. Many prehistoric deposits, as well as those from the 1801 event, contain xenoliths of large size and abundant quantity.

History 

Lava attributed to a shield-stage Hualālai has been found just offshore of the volcano's northwest rift zone. These lavas persisted until an estimated 130,000 years ago. Hualālai entered the post-shield stage, the stage it is presently in, about 100,000 years ago. Pumice and trachyte eruptions at Puu Waawaa may be a sign of this change.

Geological mapping of the volcano has indicated that as much as 80% of the volcano's surface has been topped by lava flows during the last 5,000 years, entirely composed of shield alkalic basalt. More than half of this is under 3,000 years old, and about 12% is less than 1,000 years of age. Between the years 1700 and 2016, eruptions originated from six vents; four of these lava flows poured into the sea to the west coast.

Eruption history 
Hualālai is the third most active volcano making up the island of Hawaii, behind Kīlauea and Mauna Loa. Although the two larger volcanos have each erupted over 150 times in the last 1,000 years, Hualālai has done so but 3 times. The recurrence of activity at the volcano seems to be every 200 to 300 years.

A recent calm period, with almost no earthquake or magmatic activity at Hualālai, has seen the growth of homes, businesses, and resorts on the mountain's flanks. The most recent major activity at the volcano was in 1929, when an intense earthquake swarm rocked Hualālai, most likely caused by magmatic action near the volcano's peak. Although it has been relatively placid in the recent past, Hualālai is still potentially active, and is expected to erupt again within the next 100 years.

Lava stratigraphy 
The United States Geological Survey (USGS) has divided the exposed lava flows and tephra erupted by Hualālai volcano during the last 112,000 years into 419 rock units of eight chronostratigraphic age groups. These are summarized in the table below:

1800–1801 eruption 

Hualālai last erupted in 1800–1801. This eruption produced very fluid alkalic basalt lava flows that entered the ocean off the western tip of Hawaii island. Although five vents were active at the time, only two produced flows that eventually reached the ocean. One volcanic vent, situated high on the slope, produced a large ʻaʻā flow, dubbed the Kaʻūpūlehu flow, that reached the ocean as two distinct lobes. On its way down, it overran a village and a valuable  fishing pond. There is a local legend that after the failure of several offerings of animals and other items to the gods, the flow was finally stopped when Kamehameha I threw a lock of his own hair into the fire. The Ka'ūpūlehu flow is also known for the particularly large quantity of mafic and ultramafic xenoliths that came up with it.

The other major outflow from the event reached the sea south of Kiholo Bay, destroying the village of Kaʻūpūlehu. The eruption at Hualālai is believed to have been concurrent with an eruption at the nearby Mauna Loa. It is theorized that in the near past, Hualālai has been active around the same time as both Mauna Loa and Kilauea, although precise dating is impossible.

Recent activity 

A severe earthquake swarm shook the volcano in 1929, lasting about a month. This caused $100,000 worth of damage to the Kona district ($1.2 million as of 2010), and two earthquakes with magnitudes of 5.5 and 6.5 were felt as far away as Honolulu. This was probably caused by magma movement near the surface, but there was no surface activity or eruption.

The 2006 Kiholo Bay earthquake, with epicenter just to the north in Kiholo Bay near Māhukona, caused much damage in the area.

Future monitoring 

Hualālai is expected to erupt again in the near future, as a 200- to 300-year estimated pause in activity is coming to an end. According to the USGS lava-flow hazard zones, on a scale of 1 to 9, all of Hualālai is listed as threat level 4. For comparison, almost all of Kīlauea and Mauna Loa is listed as threat levels 1 through 3. The flanks of the volcano do not pose a lower threat to the population than the area near the rift zones because the distance is short and the slopes are steep; lava poses as much of a threat as it does near its source. The 2018 National Volcanic Threat Assessment published by the US Geological Survey classified Hualālai as a high threat volcano, with an overall threat score of 109, and ranked it 23rd among United States volcanoes most likely to threaten lives and infrastructure.

During this time, not a single earthquake swarm or harmonic tremor, indicative of activity at the volcano, has occurred. Hualālai is also monitored by several other instruments, including one continuous GPS instrument and several instruments on the flanks of adjacent volcanoes. In addition, the Hawaiian Volcano Observatory uses GPS to measure slight changes in tilt and slope of Hualālai, indicative of magmatic movement.

Although Hualālai does experience several magnitude-4 earthquakes per year, these are attributed to a deep source off the coast of the north-western rift zone and are not related to the movement of magma.

Human history 

Hualālai has been a home to native people since ancient times. Centuries ago, the Ahu A Umi Heiau was built on the dry plateau east of the mountain. The Kaloko-Honokōhau National Historical Park lies on the shore west of Hualālai, over the site of an ancient Hawaiian settlement. Although it is called kekaha ʻaʻole wai (lands without water), the rugged volcanic terrain attracted much sea life, making it an appealing place to settle. There are two main attractions within the park: the Kaloko fishpond, an area of loko kuapa (rockwall fishponds) constructed of interlocking rocks across a natural embayment on the coast, and Honokōhau, a former extensive settlement on the south side of the park.

Kamakahonu, Holualoa Bay, and Keauhou Bay were favored retreats of Hawaiian royalty long before the westernization of Hawaii. It was here that Kamehameha I rested after his eight-year campaign to unite the Hawaiian isles. His death in 1819 triggered social chaos. Mokuaikaua Church, built for missionaries in 1837 of lava rock and crushed coral, still stands today. Hulihee Palace, where many of Hawaii's last kings spent their time, has been maintained as a museum since 1927.

Today, the coast west of Hualālai is a popular location for vacation resorts, since the rain shadow of the mountain causes many sunny days. The first, Kona Village resort, was built in 1961. Since then the Four Seasons Resort and the Kūkio golf course and vacation home complex have also been built on the 1800 flow. Both the Kona Village Resort and the Four Seasons Resort were damaged by the tsunami generated by the 2011 Sendai earthquake. The Hawaii Belt Road traverses the western slopes with an upper route called the Mamalahoa Highway and lower route named for Queen Kaahumanu.

Much of the Kona coffee crop grows on Hualālai's western slope near the town of Holualoa.
The family of early coffee merchant Henry Nicholas Greenwell owned a large ranch on the western side of the volcano. The road from Kailua-Kona up the slopes of Hualālai is named for Frank "Palani" Greenwell.
Hawaii Route 200 known as the Saddle Road, crosses the plateau north of Hualālai, where the Pohakuloa Training Area provides a remote training ground for the United States Army and United States Marine Corps.

Ecology and environment 

Although some of Hualālai is bare volcanic rock, most of it is covered by some form of vegetation. Bushes, ferns, and grass are common, and even a few ōhia lehua trees (Metrosideros polymorpha) grow along the summit. Many of the collapse craters in particular have vegetation, and a few even have respectably-sized "vertical forests" inside, including several eucalyptus tree groves. The volcano is populated by many birds and animals; the coast in particular attracts many fish and sea-dependent animals, such as the green sea turtle (Chelonia mydas) and the black-winged stilt (Himantopus himantopus). Hualālai averages  of rainfall per year. The summit gets more rain than the coast and is typically obscured in heavy cloud cover and vog.

Several ecological reserves lie on the flanks of Hualālai. The Puu Waa Waa forest sanctuary was established in 1992 (along with the Laupahoehoe sister reserve on Mauna Kea) as a testbed for long term ecological research about Hawaiian moist forest and dry forest biomes, and lies within a mile of the volcano's summit on its northwestern flank. Elevation differs from sea level near the coastal edge to  near the summit. Plentiful lava flows from the 19th century provide unique niches for vegetative and soil growth in the region. The southern section of the reserve, closest to the summit, has been split into a bird sanctuary.

The reserve measures  and protects an ecosystem that has since been largely deforested in the surrounding area. The Wai Aha spring reserve on the lower slopes of the mountain is somewhat swampy and is home to the flowering evergreen ōhia (Metrosideros polymorpha), the woody climber Ieie (Freycinetia arborea), and a dense undergrowth of Amau (Sadleria cyatheoides).

See also

List of mountain peaks of the United States
List of volcanoes in the United States
List of mountain peaks of Hawaii
Evolution of Hawaiian volcanoes
Hawaii hotspot
Hawaiian–Emperor seamount chain

References

External links
 
 
 USGS page about Hualalai
 Aerial photos of Hualalai

Volcanoes of the Island of Hawaii
Active volcanoes
Mountains of Hawaii
Shield volcanoes of the United States
Polygenetic shield volcanoes
Pleistocene shield volcanoes
Holocene shield volcanoes
Pleistocene Oceania
Quaternary Oceania
Holocene Oceania
Cenozoic Hawaii